Catocala aestimabilis is a moth of the family Erebidae. It is found in Xinjiang, China.

References

Moths described in 1892
aestimabilis
Moths of Asia